Stann Creek can refer to:

 Stann Creek District, Belize
 Dangriga (formerly known as Stann Creek Town), a town in Stann Creek District, Belize
 North Stann Creek, a river in southeastern Belize
 South Stann Creek, a river in southeastern Belize